Bryce Owen Johnson (born April 18, 1977)  is an American actor.

Early life
Johnson born in Reno, Nevada. He has an older brother, Brendon, and a younger brother, Brett. He moved to Denver, Colorado, at the age of five. He graduated from high school in 1995.  Afterwards, the family relocated to Sioux City, Iowa, where Bryce attended acting classes at the local community college before deciding to embark on his acting career.

Career
He headed for Hollywood at 19 after his mother encouraged him not to join the Navy.  While working odd-jobs to pay the bills he looked for auditions and enrolled at Pasadena's American Academy of Dramatic Arts.  He was receiving minor work until his break came in 1999 when he was cast as Josh Ford in The WB's Popular. Also in that year he was part of the cast of MTV series Undressed. After the show ended in 2001, he continued on the platform of more teen-oriented projects with minor guest roles on Dawson's Creek, Gilmore Girls and other teenage shows.

By the time he approached his mid 20s, he wanted to branch into more adult and challenging roles trying to stay clear of the teen genre.  2004 saw him playing a cheerleader in Bring It On Again and starring in two films screened at the Sundance Film Festival, Home of Phobia and the Harry + Max. In 2003 he returned to television in an unaired series, Still Life, and made appearances on What I Like About You, Nip/Tuck, and House while doing voice-over work for video games. In 2006 he starred in a controversial film, Sleeping Dogs Lie, with Melinda Page Hamilton, which also screened at the Sundance Film Festival.

He is a series regular on Lone Star portraying Drew Thatcher, and also had a recurring role as Detective Darren Wilden on Pretty Little Liars. In 2011, Johnson starred in MTV's Death Valley as UTF police officer Billy Pierce. That same year, he played a supporting role as Chad in the dark romantic comedy Hit List. He guest-starred in the Glee episode "Previously Unaired Christmas" in December 2013, playing Cody Tolentino.

Filmography

Film

Television

Web

Video games

References

External links
 
 

1977 births
20th-century American male actors
21st-century American male actors
American male film actors
American male television actors
American male voice actors
Living people
Male actors from Denver
Male actors from Nevada
Actors from Reno, Nevada